Online child abuse is a unique form of child abuse also known as “Cyber Molestation” due to its virtual, distanced, and anonymous nature. Such abuse may not happen face-to-face, nor does it necessarily require physical contact. However, online abuse can result in negative face-to-face consequences in the form of statutory rape, forcible sexual assault, harassment, etc. In the United States, online child abuse is recognized as a form of child abuse by the National Society for the Prevention of Cruelty to Children.

Online abuse of children can occur through a variety of forms. Including, but not limited, to cyber-bullying, grooming, and sexual abuse. Such abuse requires the use of the World Wide Web or cellphones, increasing its significance in an increasingly technological world. The perpetrator of such online abuse may be a stranger or someone who is previously known by the victim.
A report by the Data & Society Research Institute and the Center for Innovative Public Health Research showed that 72% of U.S. Internet users have witnessed some form of online harassment or abuse, while 47% have personally experienced it. This study found no distinction between genders with respect to harassment, but deduced that women were at risk for a wider variety of online abuse.

Governments across the world have acknowledged the importance of recognizing and combating online abuse of children. In the United States this effort is led by the Internet Crimes Against Children Task Force. This task force consists of 61 individual task forces engaging with 4,500 federal, state, and local law-enforcement agencies all with the goal of combating online abuse of children.

Cyber-bullying 

Cyber-bullying, or Internet bullying, occurs when an individual or group electronically distributes negative, false, or otherwise harmful content about an individual or group using personal or private information that causes humiliation or distress to that individual. Cyber-bullying can happen through the use of any device that is able to connect to the Internet (desktop, mobile devices, gaming devices, etc.) of cellphones and does not require the perpetrator to be in the same vicinity of the victim.
Cyber-bullying is especially prevalent among children as an extension of bullying within schools. A Canadian research study found that children who were victims of cyber-bullying and also bullied in school were more likely to bully others over cyberspace.

Prevalence 

Studies show a rising trend in online bullying. Although it remains the least-reported form of bullying it is relatively hidden and believed to be under-reported. Because victims often cannot evade cyber-bullies, they may harbor feelings of guilt, incompetence or despair. Upwards of 37% of victims of cyber-bullying do not report their abuse. According to statistics of cyber-bullying from the i-SAFE Foundation, more than 50% of adolescents have been the victims of cyber-bullying, where one-third of them have been threatened online. A roughly equal number admit to having engaged in perpetrating cyber-bullying themselves. Of the victims that reported their abuse, 25% reported repeated cyber-bullying. The Harford County Examiner reported that far more than 50% of child victims hid the issue from their parents when it occurred. The same examination reported that 1 in 10 youths had damaging photos taken of themselves without their permission, and that girls are more likely to be involved with cyber-bullying than boys, both as bullies and as victims. Different social groups and ages tend to receive differing amounts of unwanted negative feedback. For example, a reported 55.2% of young LGBTQ community members have been victims of cyber-bullying. Another trend shows that school-aged children are more likely to be victims of online abuse.

Variation 

A study in 2011 found three primary reasons for targeting others over the Internet: informal social control, dominance, and entertainment. Informal social control is applying pressure to change another person's behavior. Dominance refers to the attempt(s) of hurting someone, humiliating someone, or gaining access to their personal information (secrets, explicit photos, etc.). Entertainment refers to what is commonly known as trolling: purposefully humiliating, annoying, or bothering someone for the purpose of eliciting an emotional response for the bully's enjoyment. Perpetrators of trolling are called trolls, which are a subset of cyberbullies.

Effects 

Cyber-bullying is very common among children and young adults that are ten to eighteen years old. Victims of cyber-bullying, often feel negative about themselves after being bullied. It is also common for cyber-bullying to have negative effects on cyber victims' social well-being because it has a negative impact on their self-esteem. Another consequence of cyber-bullying is that a cyber victim may fear for their own safety. Further research conducted by Patchin & Hinduja (2010) found that those involved with cyber-bullying, as perpetrators, victims, or both, have significantly lower self-esteem than those who have little to no exposure to cyber-bullying. Kowalski & Limber (2013) also found that bullies and victims had the most negative scores on most measures of psychological health, physical, health, and academic performance.

Laws

United States
In the United States, parents are encouraged to monitor their children's online activity and deal with cyber-bullying appropriately. If cyber-bullying involves sexual content or sexting, however, the cyberbully and their parents can also be subject to legal consequences, including being registered as sexual offenders. Cyber-bullying that does not involve explicit sexual content can be more difficult to prosecute because there are no federal laws directly protecting children from direct forms of cyber-bullying. Cases of cyber-bullying are difficult to pursue in the United States due to infringement on First Amendment rights (i.e.: freedom of speech).

U.S. schools can take action on incidents that occur outside of school if there is either a clear 'disruption to the educational process' or a 'true' threat to one (or more) of the students. For an expression to be considered a 'true' threat, the federal court must determine "whether a reasonable person would foresee that the statement would be interpreted by those to whom the maker communicates the statement as a serious expression of intent to harm or assault". As cyberbulling is increasingly recognized as a nationwide issue in the United States, whether or not public schools can limit their students' speech outside of school hours is becoming more of an issue.

High-profile cases of cyberbullying have been brought to the attention of state and local legislatures, and most U.S. states have implemented laws that ban any online communication that aims to cause humiliation, emotional distress, or fright. Prosecution of cyber-bullying cases are usually a combination of civil laws that best fit the nature of each individual case. Most states have both anti-bullying laws and policies, save for Arizona, Arkansas, Colorado, Hawaii, Mississippi, Missouri, North Carolina, and Texas. Stopbullying.gov, a federal agency tasked with preventing all forms of bullying, has created a detailed list of state laws and policies. An examples of a state anti-bullying campaign is the Massachusetts Aggression Reduction Center, which provides curriculum to educators about cyber-bullying and its connection to bullying inside of schools.

Cyber-bullying was specifically targeted in federal law by the Megan Meier Cyber-bullying Prevention Act introduced to the House of Representatives in 2009. This prevention act sought to:

This act was the result of the suicide of Megan Meier in 2006. Megan was the victim of cyber-bullying by a mother and teen daughter, which resulted in Megan committing suicide in her home in Missouri.

Grooming 

Grooming is a phenomenon that can occur on or offline. The official definition of grooming used by the U.S. Department of Justice is: 

The above definition emphasizes the use of the child's family in building trust with the child. When grooming occurs online, however, this is frequently done without the knowledge or compliance of any adult. When children can use the Internet without supervision, there is more room for potential abuse.

Online grooming itself can be driven by a variety of things. Most common is the use of online grooming to build a trusting relationship with a child in order to engage in either online or in-person sexual acts. The Internet is used to lead a child to potential sexual behavior. Grooming can also be used for other forms of exploitation of the child, such as blackmail for monetary gain and more. The two forms may be used in combination, with groomers convincing children to perform these sexual acts, such as the sending of nude photographs, and then blackmailing the victim by threatening to release information about them.

Variation 

Online grooming can occur in a variety of ways. Most commonly, chat rooms or social networks are used to make initial contact with possible victims. Groomers may also use photo-sharing apps, dating apps, or gaming websites to find their victims. After establishing an online relationship, the groomer turns conversations to more personal matters, frequently sexual topics. Groomers may then engage in sexual conversations with their victims, send nude photos or videos, encourage sexual acts on webcam, or persuade the victim to meet in person for sexual acts.
Groomers are not exclusively strangers. They can be family friends or individuals who have met the child before but primarily use the Internet in order to strengthen that relationship for future exploitation of the child. Individual groomers can be of any sex, gender, or age. Grooming is considered a complicated matter, and groomers may use many tactics. Groomers may use compliments or make promises to the child in order to elicit certain behaviors. Groomers may also assert control over the child to exploit natural sexual curiosity.

Frequently, groomers make a fake profile in order to create a persona more likely to be trusted by their possible victims. Such a phenomenon is known as catfishing. The definition of a catfish is "a person who sets up a false personal profile on a social networking site for fraudulent or deceptive purposes." Although catfishing is not exclusively used by online groomers, it is a common way in which groomers contact their potential victim and build trust through a more-trustworthy false identity. Catfishing itself is not illegal in the United States, unlike identity theft, but when used as a method for online grooming is considered as the crime of grooming.

Prevalence 

Grooming and overall online abuse of children is an issue of growing concern in the modern technological era. Victims of online grooming are frequently young teens, with the majority of victims being between the ages of 13 and 15. In a 2012 literature review of research in the area conducted by various English scholarly institutions,  it was found that 9% of Internet users aged 10–17 reported unwanted online sexual solicitation or attempted grooming.

Laws

United States

In the United States, grooming is considered a federal offense. Several federal laws include sections involving grooming. Under section § 2422 of the United States Criminal Code:
The U.S. Bar Association claims that this statute "targets the sexual grooming of minors as well as the actual sexual exploitation of them."

Because of grooming's complex nature and the relationship of trust between the groomer and the victim, grooming in and of itself is infrequently left unrecognized. Only when the grooming results in sexual acts between an adult and a minor, the exchange of sexual images, or the extortion of money does it come to the eyes of a court. In the case of Shelly Chartier, the online grooming and resulting crimes were met with jail time. Chartier, through the use of catfishing both NBA star Chris Andersen and aspiring model Paris Dunn, groomed 17-year-old Dunn into exchanging nude photos and sexual acts under the false identity of Andersen. She then sent such images to Andersen who was under the impression that he was both receiving these from Dunn herself and that Dunn was not underage. Chartier then extorted money from Andersen, claiming she would reveal his possession of child pornography unless he paid her. Chartier was eventually caught and faced 18 months in prison for various crimes, including, but not limited to, extortion, impersonation, and making threats. State legislatures, such as Illinois, have introduced language that specifically includes electronic or web-based methods of grooming into their laws.

Non-governmental advocacy 

In addition to legislation, there are several non-governmental programs and initiatives aimed at the issue. For example, R.AGE, a Malaysian-based group of journalists, aims to spread information about many important issues, including online safety and the occurrence of online grooming, in the hopes of "telling stories that matter, that make a difference, that hold people accountable, that give a voice to those who don't have one."
In addition, Pandora's Protect is a nonprofit organization that aims to provide support to the victims of crimes such as online grooming and assault. In addition, they spread information in order to prevent further assaults.

Sexual abuse 

Online sexual abuse is a relatively modern trend, in which perpetrators utilize modern forms of technology such as live stream web cameras, cell phones, or social media to coerce targeted victims into inappropriate and sometimes illegal sex acts. Abusers do not discriminate and target victims of every walk of life. Online sexual abuse differs from other forms of sexual abuse in that it can be perpetrated stealthily on a global scale, allowing the offender to evade capture. At the same time, technology offers predators greater opportunities to find the youth that they prey upon. Children are often the targets of online sexual predators who will often bully, emotionally manipulate, blackmail, or befriend willing communicators on the web in order to obtain their desires. Online sexual abuse may vary from personal interactions between a victim and offender to a more mechanized process, in which children are sexually exploited for the perpetrators' profit. Online sexual predators often target young victims, with a study showing that 13% of children receive negative unwanted attention of a sexual nature on the Internet. Predators make contact with prospective targets in a variety of settings, although the most prolific place that predators troll is chat rooms, where 76% of known first encounters with online sexual predators occur. Predators troll chat rooms and other forms of social media like MySpace or Facebook, seeking people who outwardly share personal information.

Detection and deterrence of online sexual abuse are difficult because of the anonymous nature of the Internet; however, stopping and detecting an online predator's criminal activity is the task of various government organizations like the Federal Bureau of Investigation (FBI). The FBI's Violent Crimes Against Children Program was specifically created, "...to provide a rapid, proactive, and comprehensive counter to all threats of abuse and exploitation of children" in its jurisdiction. The FBI accomplishes quick response times by having agents scouring the Internet in search of perpetrators; they ask for information in forums and chat-rooms and look for the telltale signs of abusive behavior in the children they interact with. Online sexual predators, however, are often difficult to distinguish because they show a misleading representation of themselves to avoid incriminating evidence. Rather than relying completely on authorities to apprehend the perpetrators of online sexual abuse, one may decrease the chances of unwanted and unsolicited advances from online predators by keeping one's intimately private details off of the Internet. Another way to avoid unwanted sexual solicitations is to ignore, block, and report an offender to the website's management staff.

Laws

United States

A variety of laws are in place to deter online criminal activity pertaining to sexual abuse. The Federal Criminal Code and Rules outlines a variety of rules and regulations regarding sexual abuse under Title 18 of the United States Code. Section 1462 titled Importation or transportation of obscene matters, outlines what would be considered transporting obscene material over the Internet. Child pornography violates this law, among others, because under this code, "Any obscene, lewd, lascivious, or filthy book, pamphlet, picture, motion-picture film, paper, letter, writing, print, or other matter of indecent character" may be subject to fine or imprisonment of up to five years.

Online sexual offenders who target children may also fall under the jurisdiction of Section 2243 Sexual abuse of a minor or ward or Section 2251 Sexual exploitation of children under which they could be prosecuted to the full extent of the law. These sections are outlined as, "...aggravated sexual abuse, sexual abuse, abusive sexual contact involving a minor or ward, or sex trafficking of children, or the production, possession, receipt, mailing, sale, distribution, shipment, or transportation of child pornography ... not less than 30 years or for life [or can carry] any term years or for life." As noted, any sexual abuse of children, whether online or in person, is subject to strict punishment by law.

Examples 

Online abuse often manifests itself in physical and psychological harm to victims, as previously stated. In recent history, Larry Nassar, a USA Gymnastics team doctor, was charged with 60 years in federal prison when he pleaded guilty to charges related to receiving child pornography, possessing child pornography, and destroying and concealing evidence relating to child pornography. Prosecutors have stated that a supremely close link between his child pornography activities had directly impacted his repeat, "molestation of children". At the height of his child pornography obsession, Nassar had thousands of pictures of underage children. In the wake of this scandal, affecting hundreds of women of a variety of ages, reforms have been made to further combat future occurrences of this abuse by USA Gymnastics and Michigan State University. Also gathering a large following in the wake of this scandal is the Me Too movement.

The murder of Kacie Woody occurred after 13-year-old Woody had befriended who she thought was a 17-year-old boy named Dave Fagen via Yahoo! Messenger, but in reality this person was a 47-year-old pedophile named David Fuller. After grooming Woody through the social network, Fuller traveled to Woody's home in rural Holland, Arkansas and abducted her. After Woody was reported missing and an investigation was launched, Arkansas law enforcement and FBI agents located Woody and Fuller's bodies in a storage unit in Conway. Fuller had bound and raped Woody inside his rented minivan in the unit before shooting her in the head, and shot himself in the head before officers could arrest him.

See also
 Child abuse
 Cyberbullying

References

 
Child sexual abuse
Cyberbullying
Cybercrime